The 2022 Australia Cup Final was an association football match played at CommBank Stadium in Sydney, Australia, on 1 October 2022. The match was contested between New South Wales league side Sydney United 58 and A-League Men side Macarthur FC which for Sydney United 58 is also the first time a non A-League Men club had qualified for the Final of the Australia Cup. Macarthur FC won 2–0 to win their first trophy and Australia Cup and to also become the first away side to win the Australia Cup Final.

Route to the final

Sydney United 58
Sydney United 58 started their 2022 Australia Cup campaign in the New South Wales fourth preliminary round, defeating Quakers Hill Junior by a score of 7–0. Fellow NPL NSW club Rockdale Ilinden were their opponents in the fifth preliminary round, prevailing 1–0. After defeating Hurstville FC 2–0 in the sixth preliminary round, the Northern Tigers were their final regional opponent, with Sydney United 58 narrowly winning 2–1. Monaro Panthers provided less resistance in the Round of 32 match. Reigning A-League Men champions Western United were defeated in a penalty shoot-out in the Round of 16. In the quarter-finals, they defeated Peninsula Power 1–0 away in Brisbane. The semi-final was won 3–2 after extra time at home against the Brisbane Roar.

Macarthur FC
Macarthur FC entered the Final Rounds of the tournament in the Round of 32 to defeat Magpies Crusaders United 6–0 at Mackay. Macarthur FC were away again for the Round of 16 match against Modbury Jets winning 4–0. The quarter-finals match at home against the Wellington Phoenix was won 2–0 to set up the semi-final which was won 5–2 against the Oakleigh Cannons.

Match

Details

Statistics

Fan behaviour

During the match, hundreds of Sydney United fans sung Za dom spremni (a fascist chant used by the Ustaše in Australia honouring the fascist Ustaše movement), booed the Welcome to Country, performed salutes commentators characterised as Nazi salutes, and waved flags associated with the extreme far-right Ustaša movement such as the HOS flag and the flag of the WW2 Nazi puppet-state of the Unabhängiger Staat Kroatien. In response to this behaviour, Football Australia stated: "Football Australia acknowledges that a very small minority of attendees engaged in behaviour that is not consistent with Football Australia's values and wider community expectations. Football Australia took steps during the match to address these isolated behaviours, including eight evictions." 

Following a month long investigation, Football Australia sanctioned Sydney United 58 under breach of the National Code of Conduct and Ethics. The club was fined AUD$15,000, and received a number of suspended sanctions (including the possibility of further fines, point deductions in their National Premier Leagues NSW seasons, and a ban from the Australia Cup).

The main Sydney United fan group, Sydney United Supporters (SUS), later stated that they "don't apologise to anyone, ZDS (Za dom spremni)". SUS members had previously also posted photos of themselves with neo-Nazi and Ustaša paraphernalia.

References

2022 domestic association football cups
2022 in Australian soccer
Sydney United 58 FC matches
Macarthur FC matches
Australia Cup finals